ACE College of Engineering is an educational institution of engineering located in Pachalloor, Thiruvallom in Trivandrum, India. It offers engineering at Bachelor level. It is affiliated to APJ Abdul Kalam Technological University. Since 2015, its affiliated to the newly formed A P J Abdul Kalam Technological University. It is approved by All India Council for Technical Education (AICTE). All admission in controlled by AICTE and based on KEAM Entrance Exam (KEAM Code - MHP).

Departments
The following departments offer Bachelor of Technology (B.Tech.)
 Aeronautical Engineering - 60 students per year
 Electronics & Communication Engineering - 60 students per year
 Electrical & Electronics Engineering - 60 students per year
 Civil Engineering - 60 students per year
 Mechanical Engineering - 60 students per year

Campus
The campus has two blocks, one for First Year Students and Main College Building . The college has tutorial rooms, drawing halls, library, computer centre, reading rooms, workshops and laboratories. The institute has a playground, a cafeteria and facilities like hostels, transport, medical care centre. Hostel facilities for men are available.

Centre for Training and Placements
The Training and Placement Cell is staffed with full-time placement professionals. It offers students an employment placement and skill enhancement training. An MoU with Tata Consultancy Services on assistance in Placement and Training was signed which assures 50% placement in TCS and placement assistance to the rest for people entitled in the training program.

Sports
The institute has indoor and outdoor sports facilities including badminton, volleyball, table tennis, and a gymnasium. The college hosted Kerala University Inter-Collegiate boxing championship in 2014.

Certifications
The college was awarded ISO 9001:2008 Certification for Quality Management System by UKAS. The auditing was done by Intertek.

References

External links
 ACE College of Engineering - Official website

All India Council for Technical Education
Engineering colleges in Thiruvananthapuram
Educational institutions established in 2013
2013 establishments in Kerala